Centre for Digital Media (CDM) is a multidisciplinary graduate institution based in Vancouver, British Columbia. It offers a Master of Digital Media (MDM) program accredited by its four partner institutions, the University of British Columbia, Simon Fraser University, Emily Carr University of Art + Design and the British Columbia Institute of Technology .

Master of Digital Media

The Master of Digital Media (MDM) program is the first jointly credentialed academic program offered at Centre for Digital Media on the Great Northern Way Campus (GNWC). It is the first professional graduate program in digital media to be offered in Canada.

This full-time graduate degree program was launched in September 2007 with an initial cohort of 21 students. The 14th cohort of students graduated in December 2020, bringing the total number of graduates to date to nearly 500.  Approximately 60% of the graduates have been international students.

The 16-month MDM program is accredited by all four GNWC partners, and the certificates earned upon graduation bear the seals of The University of British Columbia, The British Columbia Institute of Technology, Emily Carr University of Art + Design, and Simon Fraser University.

The Master of Digital Media (MDM) program was designed and established to develop work-ready, professional talent for Vancouver's digital media industry. The curriculum, facilities and structure of the courses were developed with input from industry partners throughout Vancouver's digital media sector, such as Electronic Arts, Microsoft, Disney Interactive Studios, Annex Pro, Autodesk, Zynga, Relic Entertainment, Rainmaker Entertainment Inc., Nokia, Microsoft, IBM Canada, GRAND NCE, Clark Wilson LLP, Blast Radius. The goal of the curriculum is to produce graduates with a flexible repertoire of skills, rather than a single specialization.

The curriculum includes a combination of supervised project coursework for the first 12 months and internships for the final four months. Students work in interdisciplinary groups with both faculty members and industry professionals. Courses include Foundations of Digital Media, Foundations of Game Design, The Visual Story, and 'Projects' courses of increasing scope and complexity. Professionals from Vancouver's digital media industry serve as guest speakers and mentors, and industry partners offer internships, scholarships, and practical project opportunities for students.

The program is backed by a 2006 grant of CAD$40.5 million from the Province of British Columbia and by a 2007 commitment of CAD$1 million from the US computer game firm Electronic Arts. It also charges students $10,000 per semester ($15,000 for non-Canadians). Justifying this expense, the Trust's first CEO, Bruce Clayman, described it as "premium tuition for a premium program." To defray such costs, the Centre for Digital Media offers a number of student scholarships, as well as a variety of awards that grant students rent-free accommodations on the Great Northern Way Campus.

The program won some media attention in 2007 for using the Second Life virtual world as a recruiting tool, as well as for class activities, open houses and other live streamed events on their virtual campus.

As of September 20, 2012, the program moved into the new Centre for Digital Media building, known as CDM 685 after its 685 Great Northern Way address. In addition to 76 student housing units, this 49,000 square foot building includes a 10,000-square-foot (930 m2) filming area and green screen, editing and filmmaking labs. Classrooms are equipped with "Dolby 5.1 capabilities, high-end wall projectors, Blu-ray playback."

Industry projects

Industry projects are the key component of the Master of Digital Media program. Students work in project teams to create products for industry partners and must stay within the time, resource and management constraints that characterize professional work schedules in the digital media industry. The team must both prototype and produce a tangible result.

During Projects courses, teams of three to six students work on a focused project (or several, smaller related projects) during that semester. The primary objective of the courses is to provide a hands-on working experience with teammates who are from different backgrounds and disciplines, as well as familiarize students with industry expectations and prepare them for careers in the digital media sector by immersing them in real-world, team-based scenarios.

Each team must comprise students from both technological and non-technological backgrounds. During the course of the project, students having an engineering or other technical background are expected to make an aesthetic contribution to the project and students having an artistic grounding are expected to make a technical contribution to the project. The work must be overseen by a faculty member approved by the MDM program for this project.

Students also have the opportunity to pitch their own ideas for projects, mimicking the early stages of managing their own startups.

Faculty

Director: Larry Bafia

Founding faculty
Tom Wujec
Dr. Tom Calvert
Dr. Gerri Sinclair
Glenn Entis
Ian Verchere
Dr. Patrick Pennefather

Full-time faculty
Jason Elliott
Jon Festinger
Dr. Dave Fracchia
George Johnson
Dr. Aida Elisabeta Osian
Dr. Patrick Pennefather
Dr. Rachel Ralph
Bill Zhao

Industry partners

The Master of Digital Media (MDM) program was designed with input from industry partners throughout Vancouver's digital media sector. These industry partners continue to collaborate with Centre for Digital Media by providing internships, sponsorships, collaborative projects and prototype development opportunities for students. Industry partners also connect with students as guest lecturers, mentors, and faculty.

Startups

Centre for Digital Media allows students to pick client project or pitch project for their third term. Students who opt for pitch projects have to form a team of 3-5 members and submit a project proposal for approval by the faculty. Once approved, each pitch project team has to present in front of a panel of faculty, industry leaders and investors. After the presentation, the panel approves teams for pitch project term.

There are multiple projects which went on to the venture internship period, fourth term, which acts as an incubator space at Centre for Digital Media. Companies which spun out of CDM include Quupe Technologies Inc, Walkies Lab Inc and Generate App.

Facilities

Centre for Digital Media was designed to cater to the specific needs of digital media students. In addition to 76 on-site student housing units, CDM features many other amenities:

References

External links
 Centre for Digital Media
 Masters of Digital Media Program
 Vancouver Sun article on launch of program

Digital media schools
Education in Vancouver